Leek's Lodge is part of a former resort and dude ranch in Grand Teton National Park, near Jackson Lake.  The ranch was  established to offer activities to boys in a frontier setting. Its founder, Steven N. Leek, was instrumental in the establishment of the National Elk Refuge in Jackson Hole. The rustic lodge was built in 1927.

The camp operated as a park concessioner after the establishment of Jackson Hole National Monument in 1943. In 1977 the camp was operated as part of Signal Mountain Lodge and most remaining buildings were removed. A 1998 fire destroyed the main lodge, leaving only the chimney standing. The Park Service-operated Leek's Marina is located at the site.

Leek's Lodge was listed on the National Register of Historic Places on September 5, 1975. It was removed from the National Register on April 15, 2014.

See also
 Historical buildings and structures of Grand Teton National Park

References

External links

Leek's Lodge at Grand Teton National Park
Grand Teton Historic Resource Study: The Dude Wranglers National Park Service
Leek's Lodge at the Wyoming State Historic Preservation Office

Houses on the National Register of Historic Places in Wyoming
Houses completed in 1927
Rustic architecture in Wyoming
Buildings and structures in Grand Teton National Park
Defunct resorts
Hotel buildings on the National Register of Historic Places in Wyoming
Houses in Teton County, Wyoming
National Register of Historic Places in Grand Teton National Park
Former National Register of Historic Places in Wyoming